John F. Goodrich (1887–1937) was an American screenwriter of the silent and early sound era. He worked for a variety of different studios. In 1928 he co-wrote The Last Command.

Filmography

 Daytime Wives (1923)
 Thundering Dawn (1923)
 The Triflers (1924)
 My Lady's Lips (1925)
 Capital Punishment (1925)
 The Boomerang (1925)
 The Other Woman's Story (1925)
 Faint Perfume (1925)
 Puppets (1926)
 Special Delivery (1927)
 Shanghai Bound (1927)
 The Rough Riders (1927)
 The Last Command (1928)
 The Vanishing Pioneer (1928)
 Fast Life (1929)
 The Love Racket (1929)
 Lilies of the Field (1930)
 The Flirting Widow (1930)
 Riders of the Purple Sage (1931)
 The Son-Daughter (1932)
 Breach of Promise (1932)
 Flaming Gold (1933)
 Deluge (1933)
 Life Returns (1935)
 The Healer (1935)
 Crack-Up (1936)

References

Bibliography
 Eagan, Daniel. America's Film Legacy: The Authoritative Guide to the Landmark Movies in the National Film Registry. A&C Black, 2010.
 Solomon, Aubrey. The Fox Film Corporation, 1915-1935: A History and Filmography. McFarland, 2011.

External links

1887 births
1937 deaths
American screenwriters
People from  Delavan, Wisconsin